O-2172 is a drug developed by Organix Inc, which acts as a stimulant and potent dopamine reuptake inhibitor. It is an analogue of methylphenidate where the phenyl ring has had a 3,4-dichloro substitution added, and the piperidine ring has been replaced by cyclopentane. It is around 1/3 the potency of methylphenidate, demonstrating that even with the important binding group of the nitrogen lone pair removed entirely, selective DAT binding and reuptake inhibition is still possible.

See also 
 Tropoxane
 O-4210

References 

Dopamine reuptake inhibitors
Stimulants
Chlorobenzenes
Methyl esters
Cyclopentanes